Melaleuca eleuterostachya is a plant in the myrtle family, Myrtaceae and is endemic to Western Australia and South Australia. It is a shrub or tree with arching branches, narrow leaves and small spikes of cream or white flowers.

Description
They have hooked leaves but the tip is not sharp.

These flowering spikes are on the sides of the main branches and unlike in most other melaleucas, do not continue growing after flowering. The stamens are arranged in five bundles around the flower and each bundle contains 12 to 18 stamens.

Taxonomy and naming
Melaleuca eleuterostachya was first formally described in 1886 by Ferdinand von Mueller in Fragmenta Phytographiae Australiae. The specific epithet (eleuterostachya) is from the ancient Greek eleutheros meaning "free" and stachys, "spike", referring to the way the flower spikes appear on the sides of the branches below the leaves.

Distribution and habitat
Melaleuca eleuterostachya occurs in central-southern South Australia and is most common in the Eyre Peninsula. It is widespread in Western Australia, especially the central and southern areas and in a broad band between Geraldton and Albany. It grows in sandy or clayey soils, on plains, low hills and wet depressions.

Conservation status
Melaleuca diosmifolia is listed as "not threatened" by the Government of Western Australia Department of Parks and Wildlife.

References

eleuterostachya
Myrtales of Australia
Flora of New South Wales
Plants described in 1886
Endemic flora of Western Australia
Taxa named by Ferdinand von Mueller